Bluelight is a web forum and research portal dedicated to harm reduction in drug use. As of May, 2022, it claims over 455,000 registered users. It was formed as bluelight.ru in 1999 before later switching to the bluelight.org domain. Bluelight has a dedicated following of people who use drugs, researchers, and people seeking advice for harm reduction in their drug use. It does not promote drug use explicitly, as evidenced by the honorarium to the deceased in Bluelight's Shrine where many members who have died due to their drug use, mental health disorders, and for other reasons.

In 2021, Bluelight started a social media initiative to spread its reach in a contemporary Internet. The main focus is a Discord server (launched in February 2022) where anyone can come to discuss and ask questions about harm reduction, receive urgent mental health & addiction support, and interact with other members.

Bluelight's philosophy is to be a forum where people can meet and encourage open dialogue so people can be the "primary agent of their own physical, mental and emotional wellbeing".

Partnerships 
Bluelight.org was originally formed in 1997 as a part of a website called the MDMA Clearinghouse and in 2013, Bluelight had partnerships with the Multidisciplinary Association for Psychedelic Studies (MAPS), an organization focused on clinical research on psychedelic drugs, and Pill Reports, a web-based database for MDMA based pill testing results.

Bluelight has mentions in several formal publications.

Monica Barratt is the primary research director for Bluelight.

Researchers sometimes use web forums such as Bluelight learn more about drugs use and drug use communities.  Individual users use it to share information and ask questions.

See also 
 The Hive (website)

References

Drugs
Harm reduction
Internet forums
Internet properties established in 1997
Social media